The 1946 Clemson Tigers football team was an American football team that represented Clemson College during the 1946 college football season. In its seventh season under head coach Frank Howard, the team compiled a 4–5 record (2–3 against conference opponents), tied for 10th place in the conference, and were outscored by a total of 174 to 147. The team played its home games at Memorial Stadium in Clemson, South Carolina.

Left end Chip Clark was the team captain. The team's statistical leaders included tailback Dutch Leverman with 501 passing yards, tailback Bobby Gage with 264 rushing yards, and Leverman and Clark with 24 points scored (4 touchdowns each).

Three Clemson players were selected as first-team players on the 1946 All-South Carolina football team: end Chip Clark; guard Frank Gillespie; and tailback Bobby Gage.

Schedule

After the season

The 1947 NFL Draft was held on December 16, 1946. The following Tiger was selected.

References

Clemson
Clemson Tigers football seasons
Clemson Tigers football